Claude Sartoris Richardson (11 June 1900 – 22 February 1969) was a Liberal party member of the House of Commons of Canada. He was born in Sydney, Nova Scotia and became a lawyer by career.

He was first elected in a by-election at the St. Lawrence—St. George riding on 8 November 1954 then re-elected there for a full term in the 1957 federal election. Richardson was defeated in the 1958 election by Egan Chambers of the Progressive Conservative party.

External links
 

1900 births
1969 deaths
20th-century Canadian lawyers
Lawyers in Quebec
Liberal Party of Canada MPs
Members of the House of Commons of Canada from Quebec
People from Sydney, Nova Scotia